Coup de chance is an upcoming French-American thriller film written and directed by Woody Allen. It stars Valerie Lemercier, Lou de Laage, Elsa Zylberstein, Melvil Poupaud, Niels Schneider, Grégory Gadebois and Guillaume de Tonquédec.

Cast
 Niels Schneider
 Lou de Laage
 Valerie Lemercier 
 Melvil Poupaud
 Elsa Zylberstein
 Grégory Gadebois
 Guillaume de Tonquédec
 Sara Martins
 Bárbara Goenaga
 Arnaud Viard
 Anne Loiret

Production
In July 2022, Woody Allen announced he would be directing a French-language thriller film. In September 2022, Valerie Lemercier, Niels Schneider, Lou de Laage and Melvil Poupaud joined the cast of the film. In February 2023, it was announced the film was titled Coup de chance.

Principal photography began in October 2022, in Paris, France.

References

External links
 

Upcoming films
Films with screenplays by Woody Allen
Films directed by Woody Allen
Films produced by Letty Aronson